The 2020 Tour may refer to:

2020 Tour (Bon Jovi)
2020 Tour (Guns N' Roses)
2020 Tour (Maroon 5)

See also